Flight of the Hawk is the eighteenth novel in World of Adventure series by Gary Paulsen. It was published on April 6, 1998 by Random House.

Plot
The story is about Andy who is sent to live with his mysterious grandfather Hawkes after his parents' deaths. Andy soon finds out his grandfather isn't what he seems, but instead is an inventor, and discovers that his parents' deaths may not have been an accident. When Grandfather Hawkes's life is threatened, Andy decides he's not going to lose another person he loves. So using his grandfather's inventions, Andy becomes The Hawk.

Novels by Gary Paulsen
1998 American novels
American young adult novels
Novels about orphans
Random House books